Bethpage (formerly known as Central Park) is a hamlet and census-designated place (CDP) located within the Town of Oyster Bay in Nassau County, on Long Island, in New York, United States. The population was 16,429 at the 2010 United States Census.

History

The name Bethpage comes from the Quaker Thomas Powell, who named the area after the Biblical town Bethphage, which was between Jericho and Jerusalem in the Holy Land. Present-day Bethpage was part of the 1695 Bethpage Purchase. An early name for the northern section of present-day Bethpage was Bedelltown,
a name that appeared on maps at least as late as 1906.

On maps just before the arrival of the Long Island Rail Road (LIRR), the name Bethpage appears for a community now included in both the post office district and school district of the adjacent community of Farmingdale.
In 1841,
train service began to Farmingdale station, near a new settlement less than a mile eastward from what had previously appeared on maps as Bethpage. Schedules at that time do not mention Bethpage as a stop, but have a notation "late Bethpage".
On an 1855 map,
the location identified as Bethpage has shifted slightly westward to include a nearby area now called Plainedge.

Between 1851
and 1854,
the LIRR initiated a stop within present-day Bethpage at a station then called Jerusalem Station, and on January 29, 1857, a local post office opened, also named Jerusalem Station.
LIRR schedules listed the station also as simply Jerusalem.
Residents succeeded in changing the name of the post office to Central Park, effective March 1, 1867 (respelled as Centralpark from 1895 to 1899).
The Central Park Fire Company was organized in April 1910, and incorporated in May 1911. In May 1923 the Central Park Water District was created.

Following the 1932 opening of nearby Bethpage State Park, the name of the local post office was changed to Bethpage on October 1, 1936. The LIRR station was also renamed Bethpage station. The name Bethpage was, however, already in use by an adjacent community, which resisted suggestions of a merger and instead renamed itself Old Bethpage. The change from Central Park to Bethpage was one of the last complete name changes of Nassau County's post offices.

From 1936 until 1994, Bethpage was home to the Grumman Aircraft Engineering Corporation, which made, among other things, the F-14 Tomcat, the Navy version of the General Dynamics F-111 Aardvark and the Apollo Lunar Excursion Module (LEM) for moon landings, and for this reason Bethpage is mentioned in the film Apollo 13. Grumman was made famous by the performance of its F4F Wildcat fighter aircraft and its successor the F6F Hellcat, which shot down 5,223 enemy aircraft, more than any other naval aircraft. In 1994, Grumman was purchased by Northrop and formed Northrop Grumman. Although no longer headquartered in Bethpage, the company still retains operations there.

The Naval Weapons Industrial Reserve Plant, Bethpage (NWIRP) started operations in 1942, west of the Grumman site.

Altice USA (f/k/a Cablevision), is headquartered in Grumman's former main office.

In August 2015, a small airplane with engine trouble failed to reach Farmingdale airport, and was redirected to "Bethpage Airport" by the air traffic controller. However, the pilot could not find that airport because it was closed and had buildings on it, and the plane crashed on LIRR tracks.

Superfund site
Bethpage's history as a space and aviation center has left heavy metals, toxic waste, and radioactive byproducts dumped into the surrounding ground and leeching into the water. Bethpage as of 2012 has been declared a class 2 Superfund site. The rate of cancers and birth defects in Bethpage is statistically well above the national average, which many attribute to the polluted soil and ground water. Bethpage residents have taken action by filing a $500 million lawsuit against Grumman.

Geography

For the 2000 Census, the boundaries of the CDP were adjusted compared to those of the 1990 census, with some territory gained and some lost.

The area is served by the Bethpage Post Office, ZIP code 11714, whose boundaries are slightly different from that of the CDP. The area is also served by Bethpage Union Free School District, Island Trees Union Free School District, Plainedge Union Free School District, and Hicksville Union Free School District, the boundaries of which include parts of some surrounding hamlets, including parts of Old Bethpage, Plainview, and Plainedge. The Town of Hempstead, on its website, includes a small part of Bethpage hamlet that is in the Levittown census-designated place.

Economy 

The grocery chain King Kullen is based in Bethpage. USPS also has a sorting facility in the town that serves the New York region. Bethpage is also home to the North America Headquarters of technology company LogiTag and Altice, formerly known as Cablevision.

Bethpage is home to two movie studios. Gold Coast Studios has filmed major motion pictures in Bethpage including The Amazing Spider-Man 2 and Sisters, as well as the television series Pan Am and Kevin Can Wait. Grumman Studios also worked on The Amazing Spider-Man 2, and has filmed Avengers, Salt and broadcast The Sound of Music Live!

Goya Foods has its Long Island division in Bethpage.

Demographics

2010 census
As of the census of 2010, there were 16,429 people, 5,710 households, and 4,516 families residing in the CDP. The population density was 4,564.5 per square mile (1,764.4/km2). There were 5,788 housing units at an average density of 1,597.0/sq mi (617.3/km2). The racial makeup of the CDP was 90.8% White 85.8% Non-Hispanic White, 0.6% African American, 0.1% Native American, 5.5% Asian, 1.5% from other races, and 1.4% from two or more races. Hispanic or Latino of any race were 7% of the population.

There were 5,710 households, out of which 32% had children under the age of 18 living with them, 66.0% were married couples living together, 10.0% had a female householder with no husband present, and 20.9% were non-families. Of all households 17.9% were made up of individuals, and 11.3% had someone living alone who was 65 years of age or older. The average household size was 2.89 and the average family size was 3.27.

In the CDP, the population was spread out, with 22.7% under the age of 18, 6.4% from 18 to 24, 29.0% from 25 to 44, 23.2% from 45 to 64, and 18.8% who were 65 years of age or older. The median age was 40 years. For every 100 females, there were 93.0 males. For every 100 females age 18 and over, there were 88.8 males.

The median income for a household in the CDP was $70,173, and the median income for a family was $78,573. Males had a median income of $53,404 versus $36,708 for females. The per capita income for the CDP was $27,850. About 2.1% of families and 3.3% of the population were below the poverty line, including 4.0% of those under age 18 and 4.3% of those age 65 or over.

Arts and culture
Bethpage was the home of the Grumman plant that produced the Apollo Lunar Modules, or LEMs.

Bethpage State Park offers five golf courses to choose from. One of them, the Black Course, was the site of the U.S. Open in 2002 and 2009. Tiger Woods won the event in 2002 and Lucas Glover in 2009. While the park and its five golf courses are located almost entirely within Old Bethpage and its offices are located within the neighboring Farmingdale postal district, it is easily accessed from Bethpage.

Bethpage Water District was announced as the best tasting drinking water in New York State at the New York State Fair in Syracuse in 2006. In 2010 chlorine was added to the drinking water following new Nassau County Board of Health regulations, leading many residents to complain that the taste of the water had declined.

Medal of Honor recipient Stephen Edward Karopczyc lived in Bethpage, and the former Karopczyc School in Bethpage (part of the Island Trees Union Free School District) was renamed for him. The school now houses the Island Trees Public Library.

The Town of Oyster Bay Ice Skating Center in Bethpage has an NHL-size rink for skating, and is home to the Long Island Blues special hockey team, who practice and play home games at the rink.

Education

Bethpage residents can be zoned for the Bethpage Union Free School District, the Plainedge Union Free School District, the Island Trees Union Free School District, or the Hicksville Union Free School District.

Additionally, Briarcliffe College used to have a campus in Bethpage.

Notable people
 Eric Asimov (born 1957), wine and food critic (The New York Times)
 Sophia Braeunlich (1854–1898), business manager, journalist
 Nicholas Braun (born 1988), actor
 Lori Carson (born 1958), singer-songwriter
 Jim Christian (born 1965), college basketball player, coach
 Jim Hodder (1947–1990), musician (Steely Dan)
 Jason Moss (1975–2006), attorney, author
 Alex Reynolds (born 1987), professional wrestler for All Elite Wrestling
 Joe Sambito (born 1952), Major League Baseball pitcher
 Rob Scuderi (born 1978), National Hockey League player
 Leslie Segrete (born 1975), designer, television personality
 Helen Slater (born 1963), actress, singer
 Gary Smulyan (born 1956), jazz musician
 Gavin Spielman (born 1972), painter
 Al Weis (born 1938), Major League Baseball infielder.

References

External links

 Bethpage Community
 
 1903 map showing Bethpage as Central Park – includes Bethpage Junction of LIRR, and a creek from area that emptied into the Atlantic

 
Census-designated places in Nassau County, New York
Census-designated places in New York (state)
Hamlets in Nassau County, New York
Hamlets in New York (state)